Lowe Glacier is a tributary glacier  long in the Queen Elizabeth Range, Antarctica. The name was proposed by the Holyoake, Cobham and Queen Elizabeth Ranges Party of the New Zealand Geological Survey Antarctic Expedition, 1964–65, after D. Lowe, a member of the party.

References

Glaciers of the Ross Dependency
Shackleton Coast